Management of Savagery: The Most Critical Stage Through Which the Islamic Nation Will Pass (Idārat at-Tawaḥḥuš: Akhṭar marḥalah satamurru bihā l 'ummah), also translated as Administration of Savagery, is a book by the Islamist strategist Abu Bakr Naji, published on the Internet in 2004. It aimed to provide a strategy for al-Qaeda and other extremists whereby they could create a new Islamic caliphate.

The real identity of Abu Bakr Naji is claimed by the Al Arabiya Institute for Studies to be Mohammad Hasan Khalil al-Hakim. His known works are this piece and some contributions to the al-Qaeda online magazine Sawt al-Jihad. National Public Radio has described Naji as a "top al-Qaida insider" and characterized the work as "al-Qaida's playbook".

Etymology 
The word in the title توحش  tawaḥḥuš has been translated as "savagery" or "barbarism". As it is a form V verbal noun derived from the root وحش waḥš "wild animal", it has also accordingly been translated "beastliness".

Themes and stages
Management of Savagery discusses the need to create and manage nationalist and religious resentment and violence in order to create long-term propaganda opportunities for jihadist groups. Notably, Naji discusses the value of provoking military responses from superpowers in order to recruit and train guerrilla fighters and to create martyrs. Naji suggests that a long-lasting strategy of attrition will reveal fundamental weaknesses in the ability of superpowers to defeat committed jihadists.

Naji professes to have been inspired by Ibn Taymiyya, the influential 14th-century Islamic scholar and theologian.

Stages
The Najji describes three states of jihad.

In practice
A number of media outlets have compared the attempts by the Islamic State of Iraq and the Levant to establish territorial control in Iraq and Syria with the strategy outlined in Management of Savagery. The first issue of the Islamic State's online magazine, Dabiq, contained discussion of guerrilla warfare and tactics that closely resembled the writings and terminology used in Management of Savagery, although the book was not mentioned directly. Journalist Hassan Hassan, writing in The Guardian, reported an ISIL-affiliated cleric as saying that Management of Savagery is widely read among the group's commanders and some of its rank-and-file fighters. It was also mentioned by another member of ISIL in a list of books and ideologues that influence the group.

Al-Qaeda in the Arabian Peninsula has been described by The Jamestown Foundation as following Naji's guidelines in Yemen, while the book has been mentioned positively in interviews with members of Somalia's Al-Shabaab.

Scholars Brian A. Jackson and Bryce Loidolt argue that Management of Savagery and Mustafa Setmariam Nasar's The Global Islamic Resistance Call led al-Qaeda to innovate and shift practices.

See also
 Al Qaeda Handbook

References

External links
 
The Management of Savagery English Translation 
Stealing Al‐Qa'ida's Playbook Overview, Jarret M. Brachman et al., Combating Terrorism Center

Guerrilla warfare handbooks and manuals
Terrorism handbooks and manuals
Propaganda books and pamphlets
2004 books
Works by al-Qaeda